Lee Ho-jae (born January 3, 1973) is a South Korean film director and screenwriter. Lee debuted with the crime thriller The Scam (2009). It won Best New Director at the 46th Grand Bell Awards in 2009 and 46th Baeksang Arts Awards in 2010.

His second feature science fiction drama Robot, Sori (2016) is about a man who tracks down his missing daughter's voice with the help of a robot. As they continue their journey, they form an unforgettable bond.

Filmography 
Forbidden Floor (2006) - screenwriter
The Scam (2009) - director, screenwriter
Vertical Limit (short film, 2010) - director, screenwriter, cinematographer, editor 
How to Use Guys with Secret Tips (2013) - script editor
Robot, Sori (2016) - director, screenwriter

Awards 
2009 46th Grand Bell Awards: Best New Director (The Scam)
2010 46th Baeksang Arts Awards: Best New Director (Film) (The Scam)

References

External links 
 
 
 

1973 births
Living people
South Korean film directors
South Korean screenwriters